Foliaki is a surname. Notable people with the surname include:

Papiloa Foliaki, Tongan politician
Simione Foliaki (born 1981), Tongan rugby league footballer
Soane Lilo Foliaki (1933–2013), Tongan Roman Catholic bishop

Tongan-language surnames